Alexander Zammit (born 3 March 1962) is a former Maltese wrestler. He competed in the men's freestyle 74 kg category at the 1982 Commonwealth Games in Brisbane, in the men's freestyle 74 kg category at the 1983 Mediterranean Games in Casablanca and participated in the men's freestyle 68 kg category at the 1984 Summer Olympics.

References

1962 births
Living people
Maltese male sport wrestlers
Olympic wrestlers of Malta
Wrestlers at the 1984 Summer Olympics
Place of birth missing (living people)